Robyn Archer, AO, CdOAL (born 1948) is an Australian singer, writer, stage director, artistic director, and public advocate of the arts, in Australia and internationally.

Life
Archer was born Robyn Smith in Prospect, South Australia. She began singing at the age of four years and singing professionally from the age of 12 years, everything from folk and pop and graduating to blues, rock, jazz and cabaret. She graduated from Adelaide University and immediately took up a full-time singing career. Archer has a Bachelor of Arts (Honours English) and Diploma of Education from Adelaide University.

Archer is gay.

Performance
In 1974 Archer sang Annie I in the Australian premiere of Brecht/Weill's The Seven Deadly Sins to open The Space of the Adelaide Festival Centre. She subsequently played Jenny in Kurt Weill's Threepenny Opera for New Opera South Australia where she met English translator and editor John Willett. Since then her name has been linked particularly with the German cabaret songs of Weill, Eisler, and Paul Dessau and others from the Weimar Republic, a repertoire which Willett guided her to.

Her one-woman cabaret A Star is Torn (1979) covering various female singers including Billie Holiday and her 1981 show The Pack of Women both became successful books and recordings, the latter also being produced for television in 1986. She played A Star is Torn throughout Australia from 1979 to 1983, and for a year at Wyndham's Theatre in London's West End.

Archer has continued to sing a wide-ranging repertoire and in 2008/2009 gave a series of concerts including iprotest! (with Paul Grabowsky) and separate German and French concerts with Michael Morley. All were sell-outs and critically acclaimed.

Robyn has written and devised many works for the stage from The Conquest of Carmen Miranda to Songs From Sideshow Alley and Cafe Fledermaus (directed by Barrie Kosky to open the Merlyn Theatre at the Malthouse in Melbourne). In 1989 she was commissioned to write a new opera, Mambo, for the Nexus Opera, London. In 2008 her play Architektin premiered in Adelaide and in 2009 she devised the Tough Nut Cabaret for a production in Pittsburgh, USA.

Festival director and public speaker
Robyn Archer is also a director of arts festivals in Australia and overseas. Her career took this turn accidentally, with an invitation while she was performing her show Le Chat Noir in Canberra to direct the National Festival of Australian Theatre which was hosted by the national capital. She directed the 1993, 1994 and 1995 editions and this began a string of Artistic Director positions at the Adelaide Festival of Arts (1998 and 2000), the Melbourne International Arts Festival (2002–2004). She created Ten Days on the Island, an international arts festival for Tasmania, spent two years as Artistic Director of the European Capital of Culture, and advised on the start-up of Luminato in Toronto. In 2007 she created The Light in Winter for Federation Square in Melbourne and in July 2009 was appointed Creative Director of the Centenary of Canberra 2013.

She is in frequent demand as a speaker and public advocate of the arts all over the world, and her Wal Cherry and Manning Clark Memorial Lectures in 2008/2009 have increased that status. She was a commentator at the inaugural broadcast Sydney Gay and Lesbian Mardi Gras for the ABC, Australia. She has been a television guest on The Michael Parkinson Show, Clive James at Home, Good News Week (ABC); Adelaide Festival 1998 (ABC National three-part series), the David Frost New Year Special, The Midday Show, Tonight Live, Review, Dateline, Denton, and Express.

On 1 April 2016 Robyn Archer AO was inducted into the South Australian Music Hall of Fame.

Discography

Albums

Videography
Eating on the Plane (ABC for Kids film clip, 1990) (appeared on ABC for Kids: Video Hits from 1991) (Director: Tony Wellington; Producer: Vicki Watson)

Works

Stage works as writer, composer or devisor
 Live-Could-Possibly-Be-True-One-Day Adventures of Superwoman (1974)
 Kold Komfort Kaffe (1978)
 A Star Is Torn (1979)
 Songs from Sideshow Alley (1980) 
 Captain Lazar and his Earthbound Circus (1980)
 The Pack of Women (1981)
 The Conquest of Carmen Miranda (1982)
 Cut and Thrust (1983)
 Il Magnifico (1984)
 The 1985 Scandals (1985)
 Akwanso, Fly South (1988)
 Cafe Fledermaus (1990)
 Mrs Bottle's Absolutely Blurtingly Beautiful World Beating Burp (1990)
 Le Chat Noir (1991)
 The Bridge (1992)
 See Ya Next Century (1993)
 Ningali (1994)
 Sappho Sings the Blues (1997)
 Boy Hamlet (2000)
 Architektin (2008)

Other published works
 The Robyn Archer Songbook (McPhee Gribble, 1980)
 Mrs Bottle Burps (Nelson, 1983)
 'Introduction', Women's Role (The National Times, 1983)
 A Star Is Torn (with Dianna Simmonds) (Virago, 1986)
The myth of the mainstream: politics and performing arts in Australia today (Platform paper no. 4) (Currency House, 2005)
Detritus: addressing culture & the arts (UWA Publishing, 2010)

Positions

Current positions held
 Creative Director, Centenary of Canberra
 Artistic Director, The Light in Winter (Federation Square, Melbourne)
 Member, European House of Culture
 Co-patron, The Institute of Postcolonial Studies (Melbourne)
 Patron, The Arts Law Centre of Australia
 Patron, The National Script Centre (Tasmania)
 Patron, Brink Productions (Adelaide)
 Patron, The Australian Art Orchestra (Melbourne)
 Ambassador, the Adelaide Crows
 Ambassador, The International Women's Development Agency
 RMIT Global Sustainability Leader

Former positions held
 Artistic Director, Liverpool European Capital of Culture 2008 (2004–2006)
 Artistic Director, Melbourne International Arts Festival (2002–2004)
 Advisor to the Artistic Program of 10 Days on the Island (Tasmania)(2001–2005)
 Artistic Director, Adelaide Festival (1998 and 2000)
 Artistic Advisor, Australia Day, Hannover EXPO 2000
 Artistic Director, National Festival of Australian Theatre (1993–95) in Canberra
 Chair, Community Cultural Development Board, Australia Council (1993-5)
 Commonwealth Appointee to the Centenary of Federation Advisory Committee (1994)
 Member of the Board of Directors, International Society of Performing Arts
 Member of Council, Victorian College of the Arts
 Inaugural Ambassador, Adelaide Festival Centre
 Trustee, The Don Dunstan Foundation
 Artistic Counsel, Belvoir Street Theatre (1986)
 Patron, National Affiliation of Arts Educators
 Member of the Board, Helpmann Academy.

Honours
 Doctor of Letters (University of Sydney)
 Doctor of the University (Flinders University)
 Officer of the Order of Australia (Australia) – 2000
 Chevalier of the Ordre des Arts et des Lettres (France) – 2001
 Officer of the Order of the Crown (Belgium) – 2008
Fellow of the Australian Academy of the Humanities – 2014

Awards and nominations
 The Sydney Critics' Circle Award (1980)
 Australia Council Creative Fellowship (1991–93)

ARIA Music Awards
The ARIA Music Awards is an annual awards ceremony that recognises excellence, innovation, and achievement across all genres of Australian music. They commenced in 1987. 

! 
|-
| 1987
| The Pack of Women
| Best Original Soundtrack, Cast or Show Album
| 
| 
|-
| 1991
| Mrs Bottle's Burp
| Best Children's Album
| 
| 
|-

Helpmann Awards
The Helpmann Awards is an awards show, celebrating live entertainment and performing arts in Australia, presented by industry group Live Performance Australia (LPA) since 2001. In 2019, Archer received the JC Williamson Award, the LPA's highest honour, for their life's work in live performance.

|-
| 2013 || Robyn Archer in Concert: Que Reste-t-il? || Helpmann Award for Best Cabaret Performer || 
|-
| 2018 || Robyn Archer || JC Williamson Award || 
|-

Henry Lawson Award

|-
| 1980 || Robyn Archer || Henry Lawson Award || 
|-

South Australian Music Awards
The South Australian Music Hall of Fame celebrates the careers of successful music industry personalities and creates relationships with the upcoming youth and future of South Australian Music. 

|-
| 2016 || Robyn Archer|| Hall of Fame || 
|-

Victorian Honour Roll of Women
The Victorian Honour Roll of Women was established in 2001 to recognise the achievements of women from the Australian state of Victoria. 

|-
| 2001 || Robyn Archer|| Sir Bernard Heinze Memorial Award || 
|-

References

External links
 Robyn Archer's web site
 
 

Living people
ARIA Award winners
Helpmann Award winners
Australian theatre directors
Australian women dramatists and playwrights
20th-century Australian dramatists and playwrights
21st-century Australian dramatists and playwrights
Chevaliers of the Ordre des Arts et des Lettres
Officers of the Order of the Crown (Belgium)
1948 births
Australian lesbian musicians
Lesbian singers
Australian LGBT singers
Australian LGBT songwriters
Australian LGBT dramatists and playwrights
Lesbian songwriters
Actresses from Adelaide
Musicians from Adelaide
Australian women singer-songwriters
Australian women guitarists
Australian lesbian writers
Lesbian dramatists and playwrights
21st-century Australian women writers
20th-century Australian women writers
20th-century Australian women singers
21st-century Australian women singers
Fellows of the Australian Academy of the Humanities
Officers of the Order of Australia
20th-century Australian LGBT people
21st-century Australian LGBT people